Doyle is a surname.

Doyle may also refer to:

Given name
 Doyle Bramhall, American musician
 Doyle Bramhall II, American musician, son of Doyle Bramhall
 Doyle Brunson, American poker player
 Doyle P. Royal, American soccer and tennis coach
 Doyle Vaca, Bolivian football (soccer) player
 Doyle Wolfgang von Frankenstein, American musician, guitarist for the Misfits

Places in the United States
 Doyle, California (disambiguation)
 Doyle, Indiana
 Doyle, Missouri
 Doyle, Tennessee
 Doyle, Texas
Doyle, West Virginia
 Doyle, Wisconsin
 Doyle Township, Michigan
 Doyle Peak, a mountain in northern Arizona

Film and television
 Allen Francis Doyle, a character on the TV series Angel
 Doyle (Andromeda), a character on the TV series Andromeda

Music 
 Doyle (band), an American horror punk/heavy metal band featuring guitarist Doyle Wolfgang von Frankenstein

Other uses
 Doyle New York, an auction house
 USS Doyle (FFG-39), a United States Navy ship, commissioned in 1983
 Doyle Cup, a championship ice hockey trophy

See also
 Doylestown (disambiguation)
 Justice Doyle (disambiguation)